Karim Alami and Greg Rusedski defeated John-Laffnie de Jager and Andriy Medvedev in the final, 1–6, 7–6(7–4), 6–4 to win the boys' doubles tennis title at the 1991 Wimbledon Championships.

Seeds

  Grant Doyle /  Joshua Eagle (quarterfinals)
  Jamie Holmes /  Paul Kilderry (semifinals)
  John-Laffnie de Jager /  Andriy Medvedev (final)
  Karim Alami /  Greg Rusedski

Draw

Draw

References

External links

Boys' Doubles
Wimbledon Championship by year – Boys' doubles